Noordhollands Dagblad (NHD) is a Dutch newspaper covering North Holland in the northwest of the country. It appears in eight regional editions:

Noordhollands Dagblad employed in 2010 some 150 journalists.

References

External links
Noordhollands Dagblad

Dutch-language newspapers
Mass media in Alkmaar
Daily newspapers published in the Netherlands
Publications with year of establishment missing